Anna Kingsford (16 September 1846 – 22 February 1888), was an English anti-vivisectionist, vegetarian and women's rights campaigner.

She was one of the first English women to obtain a degree in medicine, after Elizabeth Garrett Anderson, and the only medical student at the time to graduate without having experimented on a single animal. She pursued her degree in Paris, graduating in 1880 after six years of study, so that she could continue her animal advocacy from a position of authority. Her final thesis, L'Alimentation Végétale de l'Homme, was on the benefits of vegetarianism,  published in English as The Perfect Way in Diet (1881). She founded the Food Reform Society that year, travelling within the UK to talk about vegetarianism, and to Paris, Geneva, and Lausanne to speak out against animal experimentation.

Kingsford was interested in Buddhism and Gnosticism, and became active in the Theosophical movement in England, becoming president of the London Lodge of the Theosophical Society in 1883. In 1884 she founded the Hermetic Society, which lasted until 1887 when her health declined. She said she received insights in trance-like states and in her sleep; these were collected from her manuscripts and pamphlets by her lifelong collaborator Edward Maitland, and published posthumously in the book, Clothed with the Sun (1889). Subject to ill-health all her life, she died of lung disease at the age of 41, brought on by a bout of pneumonia. Her writing was virtually unknown for over 100 years after Maitland published her biography, The Life of Anna Kingsford (1896), though Helen Rappaport wrote in 2001 that her life and work are once again being studied.

Early life
Kingsford was born in Maryland Point, Stratford, now part of east London but then in Essex, to John Bonus, a wealthy merchant, and his wife, Elizabeth Ann Schröder. Her brother John Bonus (1828–1909) was a physician and vegetarian. Her brothers Henry (1830–1903) and Albert (1831–1884) worked for their father's shipping business. Her brother Edward (1834–1908) became rector of Hulcott in Buckinghamshire and her brother Joseph (1836–1926) was a major general.

By all accounts a precocious child, she wrote her first poem when she was nine, and Beatrice: a Tale of the Early Christians when she was thirteen years old. Deborah Rudacille writes that Kingsford enjoyed foxhunting, until one day she reportedly had a vision of herself as the fox. According to Maitland she was a "born seer," with a gift "for seeing apparitions and divining the characters and fortunes of people", something she reportedly learned to keep silent about.

She married her cousin, Algernon Godfrey Kingsford in 1867 when she was 21, giving birth to a daughter, Eadith, a year later. Though her husband was an Anglican priest, she converted to Roman Catholicism in 1872.

Kingsford contributed articles to the magazine "Penny Post" from 1868 to 1873.  Having been left £700 a year by her father, she bought in 1872 The Lady's Own Paper, and took up work as its editor, which brought her into contact with some prominent women of the day, including the writer, feminist, and anti-vivisectionist Frances Power Cobbe. It was an article by Cobbe on vivisection in The Lady's Own Paper that sparked Kingsford's interest in the subject.

Studies and research

In 1873, Kingsford met the writer Edward Maitland, a widower, who shared her rejection of materialism. With the blessing of Kingsford's husband, the two began to collaborate, Maitland accompanying her to Paris when she decided to study medicine. Paris was at that time the center of a revolution in the study of physiology, much of it as a result of experiments on animals, particularly dogs, and mostly conducted without anaesthetic. Claude Bernard (1813–1878), described as the "father of physiology", was working there, and famously said that "the physiologist is not an ordinary man: he is a scientist, possessed and absorbed by the scientific idea he pursues. He does not hear the cries of the animals, he does not see their flowing blood, he sees nothing but his idea ..."

Walter Gratzer, professor emeritus of biochemistry at King's College London, writes that significant opposition to vivisection emerged in Victorian England, in part in revulsion at the research being conducted in France. Bernard and other well-known physiologists, such as Charles Richet in France and Michael Foster in England, were strongly criticized for their work. British anti-vivisectionists infiltrated the lectures in Paris of François Magendie, Bernard's teacher, who dissected dogs without anaesthesia, allegedly shouting at them — "Tais-toi, pauvre bête!" (Shut up, you poor beast!) — while he worked. Bernard's wife, Marie-Francoise Bernard, was violently opposed to his research, though she was financing it through her dowry. In the end, she divorced him and set up an anti-vivisection society. This was the atmosphere in the faculty of medicine and the teaching hospitals in Paris when Kingsford arrived, shouldering the additional burden of being a woman. Although women were allowed to study medicine in France, Rudacille writes that they were not welcomed. Kingsford wrote to her husband in 1874:

Kingsford was distraught over the sights and sounds of the animal experiments she saw. She wrote on 20 August 1879:

Kingsford adopted a vegetarian diet on the advice of her brother John Bonus. She was a vice-president of the Vegetarian Society.

Death

Alan Pert, one of her biographers, wrote that Kingsford was caught in torrential rain in Paris in November 1886 on her way to the laboratory of Louis Pasteur, one of the most prominent vivisectionists of the period. She reportedly spent hours in wet clothing and developed pneumonia, then pulmonary tuberculosis. She travelled to the Riviera and Italy, sometimes with Maitland, at other times with her husband, hoping in vain that a different climate would help her recover. In July 1887, she settled in London in a house she and her husband rented at 15 Wynnstay Gardens, Kensington, and waited to die, although she remained mentally active.

She died on 22 February 1888, aged 41, and was buried in the churchyard of Saint Eata's, an 11th-century church in Atcham by the River Severn, her husband's church. Her name at death is recorded as Annie Kingsford. On her marriage in Sussex in 1867, her name was given as Annie Bonus.

Works

Books
River Reeds (volume of verse), 1866.
Rosamunda the princess, and other tales. James Parker & Co., 1875.
Kingsford, A. & Maitland, E. The Key of the Creeds. Trubner, 1875.
Astrology Theologised, 1886.
Health, Beauty and the Toilet: Letters to Ladies from a Lady Doctor. F. Warne, 1886.
Dreams and Dream Stories. 1888.
Clothed with the Sun.  J. M. Watkins, 1912.
The Credo of Christendom and other Addresses and Essays on Esoteric Christianity. 1916.
The Perfect Way, or the Finding of Christ. Watkins, 1909.
The Perfect Way in Diet. Kegan Paul, Trench & Co., 1881.
Kingsford, A. & Maitland, E. Addresses & Essays On Vegetarianism. John M Watkins, 1912.

Chapters
"Unscientific science—moral aspects of vivisection" in Colville, W. J. Spiritual Therapeutics Or Divine Science. 1890, pp. 292–308.
"The Uselessness of Vivisection," 1882, in Hamilton, Susan. (ed.) Animal Welfare & Anti-vivisection 1870–1910: Nineteenth Century Woman's Mission. Taylor & Francis, 2004.
"The City of Blood" in Forward, Stephanie. (ed.) Dreams, Visions and Realities. Continuum International, 2003.

See also
Brown Dog affair
Ecofeminism
Hermetic Order of the Golden Dawn
Isabelle de Steiger
 List of animal rights advocates
Louise Lind-af-Hageby
Theosophy and Christianity

References

Bibliography

Further reading

Anna Kingsford website
"History of Vegetarianism – Anna Kingsford M.D. (1846–1888)" (International Vegetarian Union).
"Theosophy and Mysticism – Anna Kingsford" (Mysterious People)
Maitland, Edward. The story of Anna Kingsford and Edward Maitland and of the New Gospel of interpretation. Watkins, 1905.
Pert, Alan. Red Cactus: The Life of Anna Kingsford. Alan Pert, 2006.
Shirley, Ralph. Occultists & mystics of all ages. W. Rider & son, 1920.

External links

 
 
 

1846 births
1888 deaths
19th-century deaths from tuberculosis
19th-century English medical doctors
19th-century English novelists
19th-century English poets
19th-century English women writers
19th-century mystics
19th-century women physicians
Animal testing in the United Kingdom
Anti-vivisectionists
British vegetarianism activists
Converts to Roman Catholicism
Ecofeminists
English animal rights activists
English feminists
English Freemasons
English mountain climbers
English occult writers
English occultists
English spiritual writers
English Theosophists
English women medical doctors
English women novelists
English women poets
Founders of new religious movements
People associated with the Vegetarian Society
People from Kensington
People from Stratford, London
Tuberculosis deaths in England